Pat Welton (1928-2010) was a former football player for Leyton Orient and Queens Park Rangers.

Following his retirement from playing, he took over as manager of St. Albans City F.C. in 1959. He later worked as Keith Burkinshaw's assistant manager during his time at Tottenham Hotspur F.C. and the Bahrain national football team.

As head coach of the England under-18 national football team, he won the UEFA European Under-18 Championship twice, first winning in 1963 and retaining the title in 1964.

As well as his managerial career at amateur clubs, he was also P.E. teacher at Forest School (Walthamstow) between 1959 and 1969.

Pat was a popular figure around East Greenwich where he was pub landlord at the Old Friends on Trafalgar Road in Greenwich, where he also managed his pub football team the Greenwich Old Friends to great success.

References 

1928 births
2010 deaths
Association football goalkeepers
Leyton Orient F.C. players
Queens Park Rangers F.C. players
St Albans City F.C. managers
Clapton F.C. managers
Walthamstow Avenue F.C. managers
Corinthian-Casuals F.C. managers
Tottenham Hotspur F.C. non-playing staff 
English footballers
English football managers